Patrik Ohlsson (October 28, 1889 – April 12, 1965) was a Swedish track and field athlete who competed in the 1912 Summer Olympics. In 1912 he finished 15th in the triple jump competition. He also participated in the long jump event and finished twentieth.

References

External links
profile 

1889 births
1965 deaths
Swedish male triple jumpers
Swedish male long jumpers
Olympic athletes of Sweden
Athletes (track and field) at the 1912 Summer Olympics
20th-century Swedish people